Oued Ed-Dahab is a province in the Moroccan economic region of Dakhla-Oued Ed-Dahab, in the disputed territory of Western Sahara. Its population at the 2004 Census was 65,378. Its major town is Dakhla.

Subdivisions
The province is divided administratively into the following:

References

 
Oued Ed-Dahab Province